Nyiakeng Puachue Hmong is a Unicode block containing characters devised in the 1980s for writing the White Hmong and Green Hmong languages.

History
The following Unicode-related documents record the purpose and process of defining specific characters in the Nyiakeng Puachue Hmong block:

References 

Unicode blocks